The Orlando Economic Development Commission (EDC) is a not-for-profit, private/public partnership. The EDC serves Orange, Seminole, Lake and Osceola counties and the City of Orlando in Florida.

Since its start in 1977, the Orlando Economic Development Commission, with the support of its community partners, has assisted thousands of companies relocate, expand and grow in the four-county Metro Orlando (Florida) region. This has led to the creation of more than 164,000 jobs; over $8.85 billion in capital investment; and almost  of office and industrial space leased or constructed.

Companies the EDC has worked with include:

 Darden Restaurants
 Sanford-Burnham Medical Research Institute
 Tupperware Brands Corporation
 Lockheed Martin
 Siemens Energy
 Electronic Arts Tiburon
 JetBlue University 
 University of Central Florida
 Rollins College
 Seminole State College of Florida
 Valencia Community College

Rick L. Weddle serves as the President & CEO of the Metro Orlando Economic Development Commission.

The Orlando EDC is also home to the Orlando Film Commission. More than 2,000 film and television production projects have been filmed in the region during the past 10 years.

References

Economy of Orlando, Florida